UMB Financial Corporation is an American financial services holding company founded in 1913 as City Center Bank and based in Kansas City, Missouri. It offers a number of financial services from checking and savings accounts, credit services  including home mortgages, auto loans, business loans and credit cards, to investing and wealth management, all are offered to individuals, companies and offers additional customization options for private wealth management.

In 2015, for the sixth straight year, UMB ranked as one of America's Best Banks by Forbes and SNL Financial, based on eight financial measures of asset quality, capital adequacy and profitability. UMB operates banking and wealth management centers in Missouri, Illinois, Colorado, Kansas, Oklahoma, Nebraska, Arizona and North Texas.

History 
In 1919, W.T. Kemper and Associates bought shares in City Center Bank, and R. Crosby Kemper became the president of the company. In 1926, the bank built a six-story headquarters, adding a drive-up service window in 1928. In 1934, the bank was renamed City National Bank and Trust Company and moved to Kansas City's financial center. In 1959, R. Crosby Kemper, Jr. (a third generation banker from the Kemper family) became president of the bank and led the installation of its first computer processing system. City National acquired several other banks over the years as banking laws changed. In 1969, it reorganized as a holding company, Missouri Bancshares, which changed its name to United Missouri Bancshares (UMB) in 1971.

In 1987, UMB acquired FCB Corp. and its three banks in Southern Illinois. In 1992, UMB expanded into Colorado with the purchase of Valley Bank and National Bank of the West in Colorado Springs. UMB acquired Denver's Columbine National Bank in 1992, and in 1994, all of UMB's Colorado banks were merged into one entity, UMB Bank Colorado. To reflect its expansion outside of Missouri, UMB changed its name to the current UMB Financial Corporation in 1994. In 1995, UMB acquired Oklahoma Bank and its holding company, First Sooner Bancshares. That same year, UMB entered the online banking market in conjunction with Visa Interactive.

In 2001, UMB purchased Sunstone Financial Group Inc. and rebranded it to UMB Fund Services, Inc. It followed in 2002 with its purchase of State Street Bank & Trust Company of Missouri. In 2001 UMB also established Scout Investment Advisors Inc.

In February 2002, the UMB acquired naming rights to St. Louis' Riverport Amphitheatre and renamed it UMB Bank Pavilion. This agreement expired in 2006, after which Verizon Wireless purchased naming rights. In 2004, Peter deSilva became the president and Mariner Kemper became chairman and CEO of UMB Financial Corporation.

In June 2015, UMB acquired Marquette Financial Companies, which expanded its operations into the U.S states of Minnesota, Texas and Arizona.

As of December 2019, UMB has 91 branches located across eight U.S. states: Missouri, Illinois, Colorado, Kansas, Oklahoma, Nebraska, Arizona and Texas.

Lines of business 
Accounts Receivable Financing
Commercial Banking and Lending
Healthcare Services: Health Savings Accounts (HSA) and Flexible Spending Accounts (FSA)
Institutional Banking and Lending
Personal Banking: Private Wealth Management and Consumer Banking
Small Business Banking
Transportation Finance

Subsidiaries 
Subsidiaries of the holding company and the lead bank, UMB Bank, n.a., include mutual fund and alternative investment services groups, single-purpose companies that deal with brokerage services and insurance, and a registered investment adviser that manages the company's proprietary mutual funds and investment advisory accounts for institutional customers.

UMB Bank, National Association
UMB Bank & Trust, National Association
UMB Distribution Services, LLC
UMB Financial Services, Inc.
Marquette Asset Management, LLC
Prairie Capital Management, LLC
United Missouri Insurance Company

Recognition 
 Ranked bank number 2 in the nation by Forbes (2009)
 Entered Congressional Record for excellent performance during the financial crisis (2010)

References

External links 
 UMB Bank website
 Reuters profile
 The Kemper Timeline

American companies established in 1913
Banks established in 1913
Financial services companies of the United States
Banks based in Missouri
Companies based in Kansas City, Missouri
Companies listed on the Nasdaq
Kemper family